St Helen's Church (formally Our Lady Help of Christians and St Helen's Church) is a Roman Catholic Parish church in Westcliff-on-Sea in Southend-on-Sea, Essex, England. It was founded in 1862 and built in 1867. Further extensions were made to the church from 1898 to 1903, designed by Alexander Scoles. It is a Gothic Revival church, the first post-Reformation Catholic church to be built in Southend and a Grade II listed building.

History

Foundation
In 1862, the Catholic mission in Southend was founded. It was served by a Fr John Moore. Mass was initially said in his house in Capel Terrace. The main benefactor of the church was Helen Tasker (1823–1888). She resided at Middleton Hall, Brentford in Essex  and was made a countess by Pope Pius IX in 1870. She was the daughter and inheritor of businessman Joseph Tasker, of the United Mexican Mining Association.

Construction
On 8 October 1868, Helen Tasker laid the foundation stone of the church. The architect was Thomas Goodman and the building firm was Wilkins & Son from Chatham. Goodman designed the church to be in the Gothic Revival style with inspiration from E. W. Pugin. The carvings in the church were done by Thomas Earp. Construction of the church cost £1,700. In October 1869, after the nave, chancel and sacristy were completed, the church was opened by the Archbishop of Westminster, Cardinal Manning. As the remainder of the church had not been built, temporary screens were erected to block the view of the rest of the construction being undertaken.

In 1887, a presbytery was built, the architect was Leonard Stokes. Stokes went on to design a wing of the neighbouring convent, which later became St Bernard's High School. Benedict Williamson also designed an extension on to that convent.

In 1895, a new high altar was installed. It was designed by Frederick Walters. From 1899 to 1900, the south aisle was added. From 1902 to 1903, the north aisle and sacristy were then enlarged. The architect for these extensions was Alexander Scoles.

On 12 August 1919, the church was consecrated by the first Bishop of Brentwood, Bernard Ward. During World War II, the church lost many of its stained glass windows. From 1952 to 1953, these were replaced with windows made by Hardman & Co.

Parish
The church has four Sunday Masses: 6:00pm on Saturday in Polish and 9:30am, 11:15am and 6:00pm on Sunday. The current parish priest is Fr Alex Poblador RCJ (Rogationists of the Heart of Jesus)

See also
 Roman Catholic Diocese of Brentwood

References

External links
 Our Lady Help of Christians and St Helen's Parish site

Our Lady
Westcliff
Grade II listed Roman Catholic churches in England
Gothic Revival church buildings in England
Gothic Revival architecture in Essex
Roman Catholic churches completed in 1903
1862 establishments in England
Roman Catholic churches in Essex
20th-century Roman Catholic church buildings in the United Kingdom